James E. Marshall (born April 2, 1960) is a member of the Pennsylvania House of Representatives for the 14th District since 2007 and is a member of the Republican Party.

Marshall attended Beaver Falls High School and was employed by Ag Hog Pittsburgh prior to his election. His only prior elected office had been serving two terms as Vice President of Big Beaver Borough Council in Beaver County.

In 2006, Marshall ran for the House of Representatives against House Minority Whip, Rep. Mike Veon.  At the time, Veon was under a great deal of criticism for his role in the 2005 legislative pay raise.  Veon not only supported the pay increase, but was the only legislator to vote against its repeal.  Despite heavy Democratic registration in the district, Marshall prevailed in the general election with 53.9% of the vote.

Marshall serves on four House committees: Commerce, Gaming Oversight, Veterans Affairs and Emergency Preparedness, and Policy. He serves as Chairman of the Subcommittee on Security and Emergency Response of the Veterans Affairs and Emergency Preparedness Committee.  Additionally, he has been named to the Port of Pittsburgh Commission, a board dedicated to promoting the commercial use and development of the inland waterways in western Pennsylvania.

Marshall is against legalizing adult-use cannabis in Pennsylvania.

Committee assignments 

 Consumer Affairs, Chair
 Transportation

References

External links
Pennsylvania House of Representatives - Jim E. Marshall official PA House website
Pennsylvania House Republican Caucus - Representative Jim E. Marshall official Party website

1960 births
Living people
Republican Party members of the Pennsylvania House of Representatives
People from New Brighton, Pennsylvania
21st-century American politicians